The Greater Western Sydney Giants (officially the Greater Western Sydney Football Club and colloquially known as the GWS Giants or simply GWS) are a professional Australian rules football team based in Sydney Olympic Park, which represents the Greater Western Sydney region of New South Wales and Canberra in the Australian Capital Territory (ACT).

The Giants compete in the Australian Football League (AFL), and entered the league in 2012 as the competition's 18th active club. The club train at the WestConnex Centre in the Olympic Park and play most home matches at Sydney Showground Stadium, also located within the Olympic Park precinct. In addition it plays four home matches per season at Manuka Oval in Canberra as part of a deal with the ACT Government.

The Giants commenced competing in the AFL in March 2012.

The Giants operate three other teams outside of the AFL. The club has fielded a team in the AFL Women's league since 2017 and a reserves team in the Victorian Football League (VFL) since 2021; the latter participated in the North East Australian Football League until that competition was dissolved in 2020. A netball team, known as Giants Netball, competes in the Suncorp Super Netball.

History

Early proposals

The idea of an AFL team from western Sydney originated from the AFL's plans in 1999 to make the North Melbourne Football Club Sydney's second team. Following the momentum of the relocated Swans Grand Final appearance, the AFL had backed the move for North Melbourne, a club which had then previously gained market exposure by defeating the Swans in their first re-location Grand Final appearance. However, the venture was unsuccessful and after several games a season North Melbourne never managed to draw crowds of over 15,000 at the Sydney Cricket Ground before finally leaving the market for Canberra and later the Gold Coast.

The AFL's interest in the Western Sydney market appeared to be rekindled after the Sydney Swans' second, more successful Grand Final appearance in 2005. In 2006, the AFL introduced the NSW Scholarships scheme also known as the Talented Player Program (TPP), primarily aimed at juniors in West Sydney market to foster home grown talent and produce AFL players, a region which despite its large and growing population, had prior to the program, produced few professional Australian Footballers. The AFL was buoyed when it gained the support of then NSW premier Morris Iemma in late 2006, and the league became a partner in the Blacktown sporting facility in Rooty Hill, New South Wales. The facility was announced as the new home base for its team out of western Sydney in 2007; it announced that it had planned to grant its 18th licence in mid to late 2008. In January 2008, the AFL officially registered the business name Western Sydney Football Club Ltd with ASIC.

In March 2008, it was revealed by the media that the AFL had considered a radical proposal to launch an Irish-dominated team in Sydney's western suburbs, which would perform before an international audience under the "Celtic" brand name. At the time, the Irish Experiment was peaking with numerous Irish players in the AFL. The "Sydney Celtics" plan was first put to AFL chief executive Andrew Demetriou in early 2007 by Gaelic Players Association executive Donal O'Neill. It was said that the proposal originated at the International Rules series in Ireland in late 2006 when O'Neill put forward a plan to purchase an AFL licence in Sydney. The idea had been boosted by the hype generated by Tadgh Kennelly's appearance for Sydney in the AFL Grand Final, having become one of the club's better locally known players. However, the idea never materialised and the AFL has since stated that this was never a serious option.

Formation

Establishment support
In March 2008, the AFL won the support of the league's 16 club presidents to establish an eighteenth side in Western Sydney. The Western Sydney working party devising player rules and draft concessions for the second Sydney team met on 22 July 2008.

During 2008, the AFL Commission, whose agenda was to make a final decision on the Western Sydney Football Club, delayed it on multiple occasions. During the same year, in November, the AFL announced a A$100 million venture to redevelop a stadium originally built for baseball at the Sydney Olympics, into a boutique AFL stadium at the Sydney Showground, in the city's west.

After a third meeting in Sydney in November, the AFL cited the Economic crisis of 2008 as being a key factor in the delays. While the AFL reiterated its stance on the Western Sydney licence, the commission admitted that the delay in the decision was due to financial remodelling of the bid in response to the crisis, and conceded that the debut of the team in the AFL may eventuate one or more seasons later than initially suggested. The expansion licence drew increasing media scepticism and public criticism, particularly in the light of a poor finals attendance in Sydney, declining Sydney Swans attendances and memberships, the economic crisis and the Tasmanian AFL Bid which had gained significant momentum and public support during 2008. An Australian Senate enquiry into the Tasmanian AFL Bid concluded that Sydney had "insurmountable cultural barriers" to the establishment of a second AFL team.

In May 2009, AIS/AFL Academy coach Alan McConnell was appointed as the club's high performance manager. McConnell was the first full-time appointment for GWS and his new role commenced on 1 July 2009. Kevin Sheedy was appointed inaugural coach in November 2009, signing a three-year contract. His role commenced on 2 February 2010. His first senior assistant coach was former premiership coach of Port Adelaide, Mark Williams. Williams left the role at the conclusion of 2012, in order to become a development coach at the Richmond Tigers.

In November 2010 Skoda Australia was announced as the team's first major sponsor, signing a three-year contract which included naming rights to the team's home ground at the Sydney Showground. SpotJobs became a sponsor in March 2015. They featured on the back of the Giants' playing guernseys for home matches in Sydney and Canberra and on the front of the guernseys for all the team's away games for that year only. Currently, Virgin Australia, Toyo Tyres and St. George bank are the main sponsors, along with apparel partner, Puma.

On 4 October 2012, Greater Western Sydney confirmed Leon Cameron as its new senior assistant coach for 2013. This role expanded to Senior Coach which he held for nine years before resigning from his position in May 2022.

Establishment in Western Sydney 
In 2007 the NSW government, Blacktown City Council, Cricket NSW and the AFL agreed to the development of an AFL/Cricket centre at Blacktown International Sportspark at a cost of $27.5 million. The agreement between Blacktown City Council and the AFL was an 84-year (21 x 4) agreement. The breakdown of contributors of funding was the NSW Government $15 million, Blacktown City Council $6.75m, Cricket NSW $2.875 million and AFL $2.875 million.

The development included;

 a main AFL/Cricket Oval that has the same dimensions as the Melbourne Cricket Ground
 a second oval
 1600 seat grandstand
 function facilities; and
 Indoor cricket practice centre.

Blacktown International Sports centre was officially opened on 22 August 2009.

On 15 April 2012, the Giants played their first and only regular season AFL premiership game against West Coast Eagles in front of a crowd of 6,875 at Blacktown International Sportspark. The final score being Giants 10-9-69 – Eagles 23-12-150.

In April 2013, an $11.6 million redevelopment of a former golf driving range into a new AFL training ground and multicultural community education centre commenced, signalling the relocation of GWS to the suburb of Sydney Olympic Park. Greater Western Sydney Giants presence at the complex from 2010 to 2014 was concluded with the movement of the senior team 27 km east to Sydney Olympic Park. This move was supported by the NSW Government which spent an additional $45 million to upgrade the Sydney Showground Stadium at Sydney Olympic Park providing a new home for the Western Sydney AFL team. 

The entry concessions ended up being removed ahead of schedule at the end of the 2016 AFL season.

Player recruitment

Greater Western Sydney were provided with similar recruitment entitlements to the  who had entered the AFL the year before the Giants. Key differences included that their access to an uncontracted player from each other AFL club was able to be acted on in either 2011 or 2012. The club was also allocated the ability to trade up to four selections in a "mini-draft" of players born between January and April 1994, that would otherwise not be eligible to be drafted until the 2012 AFL Draft. They also were given the first selection in each round of the 2011 AFL Draft as well as selections 2, 3, 5, 7, 9, 11, 13 and 15 in the first round of the draft.

The 2011 Trade Week saw the Giants take part in nine trades, involving two selections in the mini-draft as well trading away players who had previously nominated for the draft in return for additional early draft selections in the 2011 AFL Draft, that resulted in them holding the first five draft selections and 11 of the first 14.

During the 2011 season, there was much speculation about which uncontracted players would sign with the Giants. In August 2011,  defender Phil Davis became the first player to announce that he would sign with the new club. During 2011, four more AFL listed players announced they would be playing for the Giants in 2012 – Bulldogs midfielders Callan Ward and Sam Reid, Fremantle midfielder Rhys Palmer and Melbourne midfielder Tom Scully.

Former Melbourne Captain James McDonald, Brisbane veteran Luke Power and Port Adelaide ruckman Dean Brogan and midfielder Chad Cornes came out of retirement to play for the Giants in 2012. McDonald and Power took on roles as playing Assistant Coaches.

Greater Western Sydney also recruited Israel Folau, a former professional rugby league and rugby union footballer, from the Brisbane Broncos.

2012: Debut season

Before entering the AFL, the club played in the TAC Cup in 2010 and North East Australian Football League in 2011, as well as the 2011 and 2012 AFL pre-season tournaments, and the 2011 Foxtel Cup.

The club played its first game in the Australian Football League on 24 March 2012 at ANZ Stadium in the inaugural Sydney Derby against the Sydney Swans which they lost by 63 points. On 12 May 2012 the club recorded its first win, defeating the Gold Coast Suns in a round 7 match by 13.16 (94) to 9.13 (67). The only other victory of the team's inaugural season was a 34-point win over Port Adelaide.

The Giants were to have numerous big losses, including five by over 100 points, beating the previous record of four set by Fitzroy in their final season, the Brisbane Bears in 1991, St Kilda in 1985 and Footscray in 1982. They lost four other games by over eighty points and finished with a percentage of 46.17, the lowest by any club since St Kilda, in 1955, had a percentage of 45.4 and, before that, Melbourne in 1919 with 43.0.

2013: Second season
In their second season, Greater Western Sydney fared even worse than in their debut season. The Giants lost their first seventeen games, an ignominy suffered previously by Fremantle in 2001, St. Kilda in 1910 and seven teams who finished with an 0–18 record. The most recent of these VFL/AFL teams losing all eighteen games was Fitzroy in 1964. Greater Western Sydney's combined percentage for their first two seasons was indeed the lowest by any club since St. Kilda in 1901 and 1902.  Furthermore, the Giants again lost five games by 100 points or more, repeating an ignominy from the debut season.

In round 19, they avoided becoming the fourteenth club in VFL and AFL history to finish a season winless, winning their solitary game for the season against Melbourne to snap a 21-game losing streak. Leading into the final round of the home and away season, Jeremy Cameron kicked 62 goals this season and was equal third in the race for the Coleman Medal, two goals behind leader Jarryd Roughead.

At the end of the season, coach Kevin Sheedy stood aside for Leon Cameron, who had been assistant to Sheedy in 2013. On 19 December 2013, it was announced that Sheedy had been appointed to the club's board. Club Chairman, Tony Shepherd, highlighted Sheedy's importance when he said, "In many ways Kevin Sheedy is the father of the Giants. He's been here from the start and has helped build the Giants."

2014: Third season

Greater Western Sydney started their third season impressively winning two of their first three games, including beating their much-fancied cross-town rivals, the Sydney Swans 15.9 99 to 9.13 67 in their first round encounter at Spotless Stadium. They would eventually finish 16th (6 wins 16 losses), which was enough to avoid the Wooden Spoon for the first time. On 13 May 2014, Greater Western Sydney midfielder Toby Greene was charged with a number of offences including assault with a dangerous weapon and intentionally causing serious injury over an alleged assault in a Melbourne licensed venue the previous night.

2015: Fourth season 

Before the start of the 2015 AFL Season, the Giants managed to sign Ryan Griffen in addition to re-signing Jeremy Cameron. The club overall had a fairly successful season, finishing 11th with 11 Wins and 11 Losses, including a victory over eventual premiers, Hawthorn.

2016: Fifth season 

The Giants' fifth season was their best yet, as they recorded their first positive win–loss ratio (16 wins, 6 losses), qualified for their first finals series and finished 4th out of 18 teams on the ladder.

A major highlight of the Giants' 2016 season was their 75-point win over three-time reigning premiers Hawthorn in round 6. Although they had beaten the Hawks by ten points in 2015, and went into the rematch as favourites, a margin of this size was unexpected. They also recorded their largest average home crowd in a season so far (12,333), and new recruit Steve Johnson kicked 43 goals in his first year at the Giants. The Giants finished fourth on the ladder after round 23, which meant they secured a double chance for the upcoming finals series. With cross-town rivals the Sydney Swans finishing as minor premiers, the mechanics of the AFL finals system meant that the Giants would play their first final in their five-year history against the Swans in Sydney.

In their first final, the Swans hosted the Giants at Stadium Australia (ANZ Stadium), with 60,222 spectators attending the match; at the time, this was the largest ever crowd for a match involving the club. The Giants only fielded six players who had previously played an AFL final, conversely, the Swans had six players who were making their finals debut. After a close first half, forward Jeremy Cameron kicked three goals in a five-minute period during the third quarter, as the Giants won by 36 points. The win was marred by an incident involving Steve Johnson, in which he collided with Swan Josh Kennedy and was subsequently suspended for one match; this meant he missed the preliminary final.

Two weeks later, in the preliminary final, the Giants faced the Western Bulldogs at Spotless Stadium, competing for a place in the 2016 AFL Grand Final in only their fifth year. In a close affair, both physically and on the scoreboard, the Bulldogs were attempting to make their first Grand Final in 55 years, while the Giants were looking to capitalise on their recent strong form. The Bulldogs led for most of the first half and went into half-time with a nine-point lead. In the third quarter, the Giants kicked three goals to lead by 11 points, but by three-quarter-time their lead had been reduced to one point. Early in the fourth quarter, the Giants kicked two quick goals to lead by 14 points, but the Bulldogs would kick two goals in response to take the lead, and, after scores were level with five minutes of game time remaining, a goal from Jack Macrae saw the Bulldogs win the match by six points. After the match, coach Leon Cameron said that the pre-finals bye did not have any effect on the club's performance.

2017 season 

There was a lot of outside expectation on the club leading into 2017. A lot of the media were talking up the side as eventual premier, thanks to the clubs' run in the second half of 2016.

In the off season the club traded want-away player Cam McCarthy to Fremantle along with picks 7, 34 & 72 for pick 3 in the draft. Canberra academy player Jack Steele was traded to St Kilda for a future second round pick. Unlucky, but highly talented Paul Ahern was traded to North Melbourne for pick 69. Crowd favourite, Will Hoskin-Elliott, was traded to the Collingwood Football Club for a future second round pick. Continuing the clubs strong trading with Carlton Football Club, they offloaded, Caleb Marchbank, Jarrod Pickett (like Ahern a high draft pick who never played a game for the club) Rhys Palmer and the clubs' 2nd round pick in the 2017 draft for Geelong's first round pick in the 2017 draft and picks 45, 58 and 135. The club traded in Richmond player, and former first round draft pick, Brett Deledio using Geelong's first round pick acquired from Carlton and its own third round pick.

With its picks in the 2016 draft and the acquisition of Deledio via trade, the club added Tim Taranto, Will Setterfield (academy), Harry Perryman (academy), Isaac Cumming (academy), Lachlan Tiziani (academy) and Matt de Boer via the national draft, and another former de-listed Docker in Tendai M'Zungu in the Rookie Draft.

The club had an absolutely horrible run with injuries over the year yet somehow managed to scrape in to the Top 4. Josh Kelly had a breakout year, all the while weighing up a return to his fathers former club, North Melbourne, on a rumoured 7-year, $11,000,000 contract. He refused that offer and re-signed before the clubs' final series. The side yet again fell at the second last hurdle, once again losing to eventual premiers, Richmond Football Club in front of a crowd of 94,000, the biggest crowd the club has played in front of.

2018 season 

A hit-and-miss 2018 season saw the Giants finish seventh on the AFL ladder with 13 wins, eight losses and one draw. Despite losing just once in their first six games, they would go on to suffer a four-game losing streak which temporarily knocked them out of the top eight. They dominated Sydney by 49 points in the second elimination final at the SCG before losing to eventual runners-up  by ten points in the second semi-final.

2019 season

Greater Western Sydney qualified for their fourth consecutive finals series in 2019, finishing sixth on the AFL ladder with 13 wins and nine losses.

Jeremy Cameron became the first GWS player to win the Coleman Medal as the leading goal scorer in the competition, kicking 67 goals during the home-and-away season. He notably scored nine goals in the final round of the season against  to win the award outright, after trailing 's Ben Brown by six goals heading into the match.

However, they defied the odds and would eventually bound into their first ever grand final. The Giants emphatically turned the tables on the Bulldogs – who had humiliated them on their own home ground just three weeks prior – in the second elimination final to the tune of 58 points. In doing so, the Giants became only the second team since the introduction of the AFL final eight system in 2000 to reach the grand final without earning a spot in the top four, after the Bulldogs qualified for the 2016 decider from seventh position (and would eventually win that year's premiership).

They met 2017 premiers  in the 2019 AFL Grand Final on 28 September. They were thoroughly outplayed by the Tigers, who won their second flag in three years by a margin of 89 points – one of the heaviest defeats ever suffered in a VFL/AFL Grand Final.

At the conclusion of the season, foundation player Adam Tomlinson was traded to Melbourne, confirmed on Tuesday 8 October 2019. A predicted transfer of inaugural #1 draft pick Jonathon Patton being traded to Hawthorn also occurred. 2017 first-round draft pick Aiden Bonar was traded to North Melbourne Football Club in the final minutes of the trade period. The Giants got in veteran Sam Jacobs from the Adelaide Crows Football Club, an exemplary ruck of his day, to strengthen their ruck stocks.

2020 season
Greater Western Sydney entered the 2020 AFL season looking to atone for their humiliating defeat in the grand final. However, despite some early optimism, the Giants' season was a major disappointment. Inconsistent performances throughout the season resulted in the Giants finishing tenth and missing the finals for the first time since 2015. They became the third team in four years to miss the finals after playing in the previous year's decider, after 2016 premiers the Western Bulldogs and 2017 runners-up Adelaide.

2021: Tenth season 
During the trading period prior to the start of the 2021 AFL season, star player and former Coleman Medallist Jeremy Cameron was traded to Geelong as a restricted free agent along with two second round draft picks for three first round draft picks and one fourth round draft pick. The Giants also traded away defenders Zac Williams for one first round draft pick, and Aiden Corr for one second round pick to Carlton and North Melbourne respectively.

The Giants also announced two new guernsey designs for both home and away games in conjunction with the teams 10th season in the AFL.

The Giants started their 2021 season with three consecutive losses before upsetting Collingwood in the 4th round by 30 points. Injuries plagued the Giants at the start of the season, with high profile recruits Jesse Hogan and Braydon Preuss, along with star defender Lachie Whitfield, injuring themselves during the preseason. Senior players Matt de Boer, Phil Davis, and captain Stephen Coniglio were also all injured during the Giants round 3 game against Melbourne.

Despite these injuries, GWS would go on to upset Sydney during their round 5 clash at the SCG, with the Giants winning by two points against an undefeated Sydney side.

Due to a major COVID outbreak in New South Wales, GWS, as well as their crosstown rival Sydney, spent the final two months of the home-and-away season away from the state. The Giants were able to navigate this period well and booked a fifth finals appearance in six seasons, finishing seventh on the AFL ladder with 11 wins, 10 losses and a draw.

GWS would meet Sydney in a final for the third time, and the first outside of New South Wales, with the match being relocated to University of Tasmania Stadium in Launceston. The Giants once again prevailed over their crosstown rival, defeating the Swans by one point in a thrilling elimination final.

The Giants’ season, however, came to an end the following week after losing to Geelong by 35 points in the second semi final at Optus Stadium.

2022 season 
GWS had a difficult 2022 season, winning just 6 of their 22 games and finishing 16th on the ladder. The Giants popular long-time coach Leon Cameron stood down after 9 years with the club ahead of their round 9 clash against Carlton following a slow start of 2 wins and 6 losses. Mark McVeigh was announced as the Giants interim coach for the remainder of the 2022 season winning 4 of his 13 games in charge.

Club symbols

On 16 November 2010, Greater Western Sydney announced their club guernseys and their nickname of the "Giants". The club self-styles its nickname in capital letters GIANTS in all of its media.

The team colours are orange, charcoal and white, with the club unveiling two prospective home jumpers for fans to be decided on for the inaugural 2012 season. One was orange with a stylised charcoal "G" in the centre and charcoal side panels on the sides, with the other featuring an orange yoke in the top half and a white "G" wrapped around charcoal colours in the bottom half. The colour of the team's shorts is charcoal and their socks are orange with charcoal fold-downs. During the 2011 season, a clash guernsey was unveiled. The jumper has a light grey background with a charcoal rendition of the home jumper's G on the chest. This was altered in the 2012 season for a white jumper with charcoal collar and cuffs, charcoal "G" symbol in the centre and orange and charcoal stylised shoulder pads. Their Canberra guernsey is the same as their home, but with a simplified Telstra Tower next to the "G".

The clash guernsey changed in 2014, to a white top with a G that was slightly smaller than the home jumper. Included on the guernsey was also a diagonal section of charcoal from the players left cuff down towards the centre of the bottom hem. This is repeated on the back, with the orange "G" being replaced with an orange line next to the charcoal section. The guernsey featured charcoal cuffs, numbers and collar.

The team motto is Think Big. Live Big. Play Big. Their mascot G-Man was unveiled on 18 February 2012 before the team took the ground for their first NAB Cup match of 2012. The club ran a competition for its members to name the AFLW mascot for the side during the 2017 AFLW Season. In the 2018 AFLW Season, the mascot Gigi was unveiled.

The club song "There's a Big Big Sound" was written and produced by Harry Angus of the Australian band The Cat Empire. The song became a bit of an Internet meme in 2019 when the Giants made it to that year's Grand Final.

From the 2021 season, Puma will produce the club's on-and-off-field apparel.

Rivalries

Sydney Swans

The GWS Giants's entry to the AFL in 2012 resulted in the formation of the Sydney Derby/Battle of the Bridge with their rivalry with the Sydney Swans, between the two Sydney based Australian Football League (AFL) clubs with the Giants competing against their cross-city rivals twice every season. The best performed player from every derby match is awarded the Brett Kirk Medal.

Initially, the rivalry was a one-sided affair in favour of the Swans, who won 8 of the first 9 derbies. However, it has become more competitive in recent years, with the Giants winning 5 of the 7 most recent derbies. The Giants have played the Swans three times in finals matches, winning each time.

Western Bulldogs

The Giants have engaged in a bitter rivalry with the Western Bulldogs since the 2016 AFL season finals series. In the final moments of the first preliminary final both teams were on top of each other trying to win the game, with the Bulldogs trying to make their first AFL grand final appearance in 55 years while the Giants would be trying to make their first ever. Despite leading by 14 points at one stage in the final quarter, the Giants lost to the eventual premiers by six points.

Since then, the two clubs would continue to play each other in the following seasons with the Giants continuingly winning over the Bulldogs. It wasn't until round 22 of the 2019 home and away season that the Giants would be beaten by the Bulldogs again, on the same ground of that of the famous 2016 preliminary final. Three weeks later, in week one of the 2019 AFL finals series, the two faced off in the 2nd elimination final where the Giants would thump the Bulldogs in a 58-point win. In that game the Giants and Bulldogs would engage in fights on field with GWS player Toby Greene attacking Western Bulldogs captain Marcus Bontempelli, in apparent retribution for Bontempelli fracturing part of the neck of Nick Haynes two games earlier in round 22, which the Bulldogs won by a similar margin. A similar event would occur in week 3 of the 2020 home and away season where the two teams engaged in constant melees throughout a match that the Giants lost by 25 points.

Supporter base

Training and Administration Facilities
The Giants' training facility and offices are known as the WestConnex Centre and Tom Wills Oval, located at Sydney Olympic Park opposite the State Sports Centre. The main oval is named in honour of Australian football pioneer Tom Wills, who was born in New South Wales and has family connections to Western Sydney.

Home grounds
The Giants play the majority of their home matches at Sydney Showground Stadium (known commercially as Giants Stadium), which is also located in the Olympic Park precinct adjacent to Stadium Australia. The club plays four home games per season at Manuka Oval (three regular season, one preseason), having signed a 10-year deal with the government of the Australian Capital Territory in 2012 worth $23 million. A Canberra logo is incorporated on its guernsey, with a slightly altered Canberra-specific guernsey used for the games at Manuka. The Giants also played in a special guernsey as part of the centenary of Canberra celebrations, stating that the team is "part of the Canberra community". A GWS/ACT Academy has also been envisioned, and the territory has representation on the club's board.

Season summaries

Current squad
The inaugural co-captains of the club were Phil Davis, Luke Power and Callan Ward. Both Davis and Ward were retained as captains in 2013, whilst Tom Scully was added to the leadership group as a vice-captain. Josh Kelly and Stephen Coniglio were named as vice-captains for the 2019 season. In 2020 Stephen Coniglio stepped into the captain role, becoming the first standalone captain since their inaugural season. For 2022, Coniglio, Kelly, and Toby Greene were named co-captains.

Honours

Club awards
 For a list of best and fairest winners and leading goalkickers by season, refer to the season summaries section.

Club Rising Star 
 2012 – Toby Greene
 2013 – Lachie Whitfield
 2014 – Josh Kelly
 2015 – Cam McCarthy
 2016 – Jacob Hopper
 2017 – Tim Taranto
 2018 – Zac Langdon
 2019 – Brent Daniels
 2020 – Lachie Ash

Community Award 
 2012 – Setanta O'hAilpin
 2013 – Jonathan Giles
 2014 – Stephen Coniglio
 2015 – Dylan Shiel
 2016 – N/A
 2017 – Tom Downie
 2018 – Adam Tomlinson
 2019 – Stephen Coniglio

Coaches Award 
 2012 – Jacob Townsend
 2013 – Tom Scully
 2014 – Devon Smith
 2015 – Heath Shaw
 2016 – Josh Kelly
 2017 – Dawson Simpson
 2018 – Stephen Coniglio
 2019 – Matt de Boer
 2020 – Nick Haynes

Academy Player of the Year 
 2012 – Nick Coughlan
 2013 – Jock Cornell
 2014 – Jack Steele
 2015 – Jacob Hopper
 2016 – Harry Perryman
 2017 – Nick Shipley
 2018 – Kieran Briggs
 2019 – Tom Green

Members Choice Award 
 2012 – Toby Greene
 2013 – Jeremy Cameron
 2014 – Adam Treloar
 2015 – Heath Shaw
 2016 – Stephen Coniglio
 2017 – Josh Kelly
 2018 – Lachie Whitfield
 2019 – Nick Haynes
 2020 – Nick Haynes

NEAFL Player of the Year 
 2013 – Mark Whiley
 2014 – James Stewart
 2015 – Jake Barrett
 2016 – Jeremy Finlayson
 2017 – Isaac Cumming
 2018 – Jake Stein
 2019 – Connor Idun

Club Goal of the Year 
 2013 – Jeremy Cameron
 2014 – Dylan Shiel
 2015 – Jeremy Cameron
 2016 – N/A
 2017 – N/A
 2018 – Josh Kelly
 2019 – Jeremy Finlayson
 2020 – Brent Daniels

Club Mark of the Year 
 2014 – Will Hoskin-Elliott
 2015 – Nick Haynes
 2016 – N/A
 2017 – N/A
 2018 – Harry Himmelberg
 2019 – Harry Himmelberg
 2020 – Bobby Hill

Club Standard Award 
 2013 – Devon Smith
 2014 – Shane Mumford
 2015 – Devon Smith
 2016 – Shane Mumford
 2017 – Shane Mumford
 2018 – Tim Taranto
 2019 – Tim Taranto

Life Memberships 
 Kevin Sheedy (2015)
 Callan Ward (2018)
 Jeremy Cameron (2020)
 Phil Davis (2020)
 Toby Greene (2020)
 Leon Cameron (2020)
 Heath Shaw (2020)
 Nick Haynes (2021)
 Josh Kelly (2021)

AFL awards

All-Australian team
 2012 – none
 2013 – Jeremy Cameron (FF)
 2014 – none
 2015 – Heath Shaw (HBF)
 2016 – Toby Greene (HFF), Heath Shaw (HBF)
 2017 – Josh Kelly (W), Dylan Shiel (INT)
 2018 – Lachie Whitfield (HBF)
 2019 – Jeremy Cameron (CHF)
 2020 – Nick Haynes (HBF)

Coleman Medal
 2019 – Jeremy Cameron (67 goals)

AFLCA Best Young Player
 2013 – Jeremy Cameron

Individual awards
AFL leading goalkicker
Jeremy Cameron – 2019

Match and ladder records
Highest score: Greater Western Sydney 24.16 (160) v Gold Coast 8.10 (58), Round 2, 2017, Sydney Showground Stadium
Lowest score: Greater Western Sydney 3.7 (25) v Richmond 17. 12 (114), Grand Final 2019, Melbourne Cricket Ground & Greater Western Sydney 3.7 (25) v Sydney Swans 10.6 (66), Round 12, 2020, Optus Stadium
Highest losing score: Greater Western Sydney 16.8 (104) v Gold Coast 21.22 (148), Round 5, 2013, Manuka Oval
Lowest winning score: Port Adelaide 7.13 (55) v Greater Western Sydney 8.8 (56), Round 19, 2019, Adelaide Oval
Greatest winning margin: 108 points – Greater Western Sydney 20.14 (134) v Gold Coast 4.2 (26), Round 12, 2018, Sydney Showground Stadium
Greatest losing margin: 162 points – Greater Western Sydney 4.7 (31) v Hawthorn 28.25 (193), Round 15, 2012, Melbourne Cricket Ground
Longest winning Streak: 6 games – Round 4, 2016 – Round 9, 2016
Longest losing Streak: 21 games – Round 20, 2012 – Round 18, 2013

AFL finishing positions (2012–present)

AFL Women's team
In April 2016, the Giants launched a bid to enter a team in the inaugural AFL Women's season in 2017. The club had previously partnered with the local Auburn Giants Football Club and run a female Academy program. They were announced as a founding club in June, receiving one of eight licenses awarded at this time.

Former AFL NSW/ACT Female Football High Performance coach Tim Schmidt was announced as the team's inaugural head coach in July 2016. Days later the club announced its first two players, marquee signings Renee Forth and Emma Swanson. As a result of the NSW/ACT talent pool's size and depth, the Giants were granted five priority signings prior to the draft, the most of any club in the league. Prior to the draft, the club had recruited no NSW/ACT players, instead drawing three from Western Australia, three from Victoria and one more from South Australia.

In September the Giants won the first selection in the inaugural draft via lottery, and selected Sydney University player Nicola Barr.

The team was sponsored by Harvey Norman, FlexiGroup and Sydney Airport in its inaugural season.

In July 2017 it was announced Giants AFL director of coaching Alan McConnell would replace Tim Schmidt as coach of side. The 2018 Giants AFLW Captain is Amanda Farrugia and the vice-captain is Alicia Eva.

Season summaries

Current squad

Gabrielle Trainor Medal winners

Reserves team

Greater Western Sydney fielded a reserves team beneath the AFL team in the North East Australian Football League (NEAFL) competition between 2012 and 2019. The senior team participated in the 2011 NEAFL season, prior to it entering the AFL the following year. Following the dissolving of the NEAFL at the end of the 2019 season, the Giants reserves team entered the Victorian Football League (VFL) in 2021.

Sponsorship

Notes

References

External links

 

 
2009 establishments in Australia
Australian Football League clubs
Australian rules football clubs in Sydney
Former NAB League clubs
Sporting clubs in Canberra
Australian rules football clubs established in 2009
AFL Women's clubs
Australian rules football in the Australian Capital Territory